Donax variabilis, known by the common name coquina, is a species of small edible saltwater clam, a marine bivalve mollusc in the family Donacidae, the bean clams. It is a warm water species which occurs in shallow water on sandy beaches on the east coast of the United States.

Distribution
This species occurs on the east coast of the United States, from Cape May, New Jersey to Florida including East Florida, West Florida and the Florida Keys.

Description
The exterior of the small shell of this species can have any one of a wide range of possible colors, from almost white, through yellow, pink, orange, red, purple, to brownish and blueish, with or without the presence of darker rays.

Biology
As most mollusks, the coquina is host to a variety of parasites. On the Atlantic Coast of the United States, studies have shown that coquinas harbour the larval stages (cercariae, sporocysts) of at least three species of digeneans (none of these represents a danger for humans).

Human uses
The coquina is edible and is used to make broth. Some people collect the colorful shells to use for crafts.

See also
 Donax fossor, a similar species with a more northern distribution

References

 http://www.dnr.sc.gov/cwcs/pdf/Coquinaclam.pdf

Donacidae
Bivalves described in 1822